Paweł Genda (born 6 February 1994) is a former Polish handball player.

References

1994 births
Living people
People from Ozimek
Polish male handball players
Expatriate handball players
Polish expatriate sportspeople in Germany
Handball-Bundesliga players